Gianni Crepaldi (born 19 October 1968) is a former Italian male long-distance runner who competed at six editions of the IAAF World Cross Country Championships at senior level (1995, 1997, 2000, 2002, 2004, 2005). He won one national championships at senior level (3000 m steeplechase: 1993).

References

External links
 

1968 births
Living people
Italian male long-distance runners
Italian male steeplechase runners
Italian athletics coaches